Ostellato is a comune (municipality) in the Province of Ferrara in the Italian region Emilia-Romagna, located about  northeast of Bologna and about  southeast of Ferrara. 

Ostellato borders the following municipalities: Comacchio, Ferrara, Fiscaglia, Lagosanto, Masi Torello, Portomaggiore, Tresigallo.

References

External links
 Official website

Cities and towns in Emilia-Romagna